Eugenio Aguilar González Batres (1804–1879) was President of El Salvador from 21 February 1846 to 1 February 1848.

References

Presidents of El Salvador
1804 births
1879 deaths
People from La Paz Department (El Salvador)
University of El Salvador alumni
19th-century Salvadoran people